Invocation of My Demon Brother (1969) is an 11-minute film photographed, directed and edited by Kenneth Anger. Its repetitive noise music soundtrack was composed by Mick Jagger playing a Moog synthesizer. It was filmed in San Francisco at the Straight Theater on Haight Street in Haight-Ashbury and at the William Westerfeld House.

According to Anger; the film, starring Mick Jagger, Manson family member Bobby Beausoleil and Church of Satan founder Anton LaVey, was assembled from scraps of the first version of Lucifer Rising. It includes clips of the cast smoking hashish out of a skull and a Satanic funeral ceremony for a cat.

Awards
Invocation of My Demon Brother won the Tenth Annual Film Culture award.

Legacy
Author Gary Lachman claims that the film "inaugurat[ed] the midnight movie cult at the Elgin Theatre."

Cast 
 Speed Hacker as Wand bearer
 Kenneth Anger as Magus
 Lenore Kandel as Deaconess
 Bill "Sweet William" Fritsch as Deacon
 Van Leuven as Acolyte
 Harvey Bialy and Timotha Doane (formerly Bialy) as the Brother and Sister of the Rainbow
 Anton LaVey as His Satanic Majesty
 Bobby Beausoleil as Lucifer
 Mick Jagger as himself

See also 
 List of American films of 1969

References

External links 
 
 Magick in Theory and Practice: Ritual Use of Colour in Kenneth Anger's Invocation of My Demon Brother

1969 films
Mick Jagger
Films about Satanism
American short films
Films directed by Kenneth Anger
Films shot in San Francisco
1960s English-language films
1960s American films